The blacknosed butterflyfish or barberfish (Johnrandallia nigrirostris) (from the Spanish names, El Barbero or Mariposa Barbero, "the barber" or "butterfly barber"), is a species of fish in the family Chaetodontidae, the butterfly fishes. It is found in the East Pacific, specifically around the Galápagos Islands and in the Sea of Cortez, and it sometimes acts as a cleaner fish. It is the only member of the genus Johnrandallia, named after the ichthyologist John E. Randall, but in the past it was commonly placed in Chaetodon.

Description
It is marked with black bands along the base of its dorsal fin, and on its snout and forehead. It has a small protractile mouth with a black, burglar-like mask around its eyes. Johnrandallia nigrirostris has brush-like teeth. It is superficially similar to Prognathodes carlhubbsi and P. falcifer, which also are native to the East Pacific.

Distribution
Johnrandallia nigrirostris is found in the Eastern Pacific from the Gulf of California to Panama, including the Cocos Island, Malpelo Island and the Galápagos Islands. It has also been recorded in Peru.

Habitat
It inhabits coral reefs and rocky areas.

Behaviour
Johnrandallia nigrirostris aggregates in small groups. It is highly active during the day, during which time it feeds. At night, it shelters near to the reef's surface. This species is a kind of cleaner fish. It will remain at cleaning stations where infested fishes come to have various crustaceans and other ectoparasites removed.

Diet
This species feeds on crustaceans, molluscs, and algae.

Taxonomy and etymology
Johnrandallia nigrirostris was first formally described as Sarothrodus nigrirostris in  1862 by the American ichthyologist Theodore Nicholas Gill (1837–1914) with the type locality given as Cape San Lucas, Baja California. In 1974 the Romanian ichthyologist Teodor T. Nalbant (1933–2011) placed it in the monotypic genus Johnrandallia, named in honour of the American ichthyologist John E. Randall (1924-2020).

References

External links
 

blacknosed butterflyfish
Fish of the Gulf of California
Fish of Mexican Pacific coast
Western Central American coastal fauna
Galápagos Islands coastal fauna
Taxa named by Teodor T. Nalbant
Fish described in 1974
Monotypic fish genera
Monotypic marine fish genera
Monotypic ray-finned fish genera